Gulzhan may refer to:

 Gulzhan Issanova (born 1983), Kazakhstani judoka
 Gulzhan Karagusova, Kazakhstani politician, Minister of Labor and Social Protection in the government of Kazakhstan since 2001
 Guljan (site), former Kazakh news website